Kosmos 50 ( meaning Cosmos 50) or Zenit-2 No.25 was a Soviet, first generation, low resolution, optical film-return reconnaissance satellite launched in 1964.

Kosmos 50 was launched by a Vostok-2 rocket, serial number R15002-02, flying from Site 31/6 at the Baikonur Cosmodrome. The launch took place at 10:48 GMT on 28 October 1964, and following its successful arrival in orbit the spacecraft received its Kosmos designation; along with the International Designator 1964-070A and the Satellite Catalog Number 00919.

On 5 November 1964, after eight days in orbit, an attempt was made to deorbit the satellite so that its photographs could be developed and analysed. After its retrorockets failed to fire, the satellite was commanded to self-destruct to ensure it could not fall into enemy hands. Ninety-five pieces of debris were catalogued, which decayed from orbit between 8 and 17 November.

References

Kosmos satellites
Spacecraft launched in 1964
Spacecraft which reentered in 1964
Intentionally destroyed artificial satellites
Zenit-2 satellites